The districts of Peru are the third-level country subdivisions of Peru. They are subdivisions of the provinces, which in turn are subdivisions of the larger regions or departments. There are 1,838 districts in total.

Overview
A 1982 law requires a minimum of residents in an area for a new district to be legally established: 3,500 if it is located in the rainforest, 4,000 in the Andes highlands and 10,000 in the coastal area.

In the dry Andean area, many districts have less than 3,500 inhabitants due to low population density in the area. In some cases, their populations have decreased in comparison to the days when they were founded. Districts that are located at very high altitudes tend to be scarcely populated. These districts usually are large in area, have few available land for use. Many basic government services do not reach all residents of these districts due to their difficult geography. Many lack financial means to govern their whole jurisdictions and they often have high emigration rates.

A similar pattern can be observed in many districts located in the Peruvian Amazon rainforest. Once important settlements created during the era of colonization, they nowadays do not offer much space for agriculture. Deeper into the jungle, the districts of the 'selva alta' (lower jungle) have higher populations living on geographically large districts. Districts located outside the colonized area have very low populations that are entirely composed of Native Amazonian tribes.

All over the country, many districts have higher populations than the minimum required by law. This is true of the colonized areas of the rainforest, the northern Andes as well as in the southern Andes from Huancayo to the shores of Lake Titicaca, which is the historical heartland of the Peruvian highlands. These districts are old and tend to be smaller in area with high population densities since prehispanic times.

Districts in the Chala (coastal area) tend to be mid-sized except in low-density areas such as the Sechura Desert and part of the Southern coast, but all of them feature large populations due to emigration from other regions of the country that turned the Peruvian coast into the country's main economic powerhouse.

Districts with a population of more than 10 000 inhabitants should ideally be subdivided, particularly if they are also large in area, as is the case in part of the Amazon rainforest. Colonization happens quickly and boundaries of districts are often not modified, except in large urban areas. This is less of a problem in the coast where communication is easier. However, reaching to large populations remain a problem in this area.

Most populous districts
This is a list of the top twenty Peruvian districts by population, population density, area and elevation (of the district's capital).

By population
Source: INEI

By population density
Source: INEI

By area
Source: INEI

By elevation
Source: INEI

Districts table

See also
 Regions of Peru
 Provinces of Peru
 Administrative divisions of Peru

References

 
Subdivisions of Peru
Peru, Districts
Districts, Peru
Peru geography-related lists